The Tbilisi sea or Tbilisi reservoir (თბილისის წყალსაცავი) is an artificial lake in the vicinity of Tbilisi that serves as a reservoir. The lake has a length of 8.75 km and a width of 2.85 km. It was opened in 1953 and has become a popular recreation spot. It is planned to develop the Tbilisi sea into a recreational park with various sports facilities.

See also 
 Turtle Lake, Tbilisi
 Lisi Lake

References

Lakes of Tbilisi
Reservoirs in Georgia (country)
Reservoirs built in the Soviet Union